Paul Frère (30 January 1917 – 23 February 2008) was a racing driver and journalist from Belgium. He participated in eleven World Championship Formula One Grands Prix debuting on 22 June 1952 and achieving one podium finish with a total of eleven championship points. He drove in several non-Championship Formula One races, winning the 1952 Grand Prix des Frontières and 1960 VI South African Grand Prix.

He also won the 1960 24 Hours of Le Mans, driving for Ferrari with fellow Belgian teammate Olivier Gendebien.

Life 
Frère was born at Le Havre in 1917.

He drove for the Ferrari works team, with Peter Collins.

After retiring from active racing in 1960, he worked as an automotive journalist based in Europe (he was the European Editor for Road & Track magazine). He had numerous acquaintances amongst vehicle design engineers, especially in Japan at Honda and Mazda and also worked as a consultant to automobile manufacturers. He also had the opportunity to test numerous road and racing cars as a journalist, one of the highlights being the Audi R8 which he tested and demonstrated during a break in the proceedings of the Test Day of the 2003 24 Hours of Le Mans. At the time he was 86 years old, making him the oldest racing driver to drive a then-current sportscar.

Frère, along with Piero Taruffi and Denis Jenkinson, was one of the first writers to treat motor racing as a skill that could be analyzed, explained, and taught. His 1963 book, Sports Car and Competition Driving is still a standard reference in the field. It influenced the development of competition driving schools, such as those founded by Jim Russell, Bob Bondurant and many others.

Frère was an expert on Porsche cars, in particular the Porsche 911, writing the definitive book on this series, The Porsche 911 Story. He maintained a close relationship with Porsche over the years. He was also considered an advisor and expert on the 911 by Alois Ruf, a respected Porsche tuner and manufacturer as head of Ruf Automobile, who consulted Frère during the development of Ruf's RGT8 Model.

In 1967, Frère had a cameo appearance in The Departure, a Belgian film about a car-obsessed young man trying to get possession of a Porsche 911 for a race.

Only weeks before his 90th birthday in January 2007, he was badly injured in an accident near the Nürburgring and was hospitalized for 14 days in intensive care.

Frère died on 23 February 2008 in Saint-Paul-de-Vence (France). Turn 15 at the Circuit de Spa-Francorchamps, formerly the first part of the Stavelot corner, has been renamed in his honour.

Rowing champion
Frère was also a successful rower winning three Belgian championships. In 1946 and 1947 he won the national title in a coxless four. In 1946, he also won it with the coxed four.

Racing record

Complete Formula One World Championship results
(key) (Races in bold indicate pole position)

Complete 24 Hours of Le Mans results

Complete 12 Hours of Sebring results

References

1917 births
2008 deaths
Sportspeople from Le Havre
Belgian racing drivers
Belgian Formula One drivers
Hersham and Walton Motors Formula One drivers
Gordini Formula One drivers
Ferrari Formula One drivers
Motoring journalists
24 Hours of Le Mans drivers
24 Hours of Le Mans winning drivers
World Sportscar Championship drivers
24 Hours of Spa drivers
Ecurie Nationale Belge Formula One drivers
12 Hours of Reims drivers
Porsche Motorsports drivers